Pumice Desert is a dry meadow in Crater Lake National Park.

Pumice Desert was a glacial valley before the eruption of Mount Mazama 7,700 years ago.

The area was designated as a Research Natural Area due to the environment's harsh, "desert"-like quality resulting from the deep and highly porous deposits. There are currently only 16 species of plant documented in this area.

References

Crater Lake National Park
Volcanic deserts